Barnby may refer to:
Places
Barnby, North Yorkshire, England
location of East Barnby and West Barnby
Barnby, Suffolk, England
Barnby in the Willows, Nottinghamshire, England
Barnby Moor, Nottinghamshire, England

People
Joseph Barnby

Ships
, a number of ships with this name

See also
Barnaby (disambiguation)